Roy Thomas Cummings (May 28, 1930 – May 23, 1976) was a Canadian politician. He served in the Legislative Assembly of British Columbia from 1972 to 1975, as a NDP member for the constituency of Vancouver–Little Mountain. He died of a heart attack in 1976.

References

British Columbia New Democratic Party MLAs
Politicians from Vancouver
1930 births
1976 deaths